Eslam Ibrahim El Karbal (born 21 May 1983) is a Libyan basketball player for the sports club Al-Shabab. Born in Derna Libya, he also played for the Libya national basketball team.

References

1983 births
Living people
Libyan men's basketball players